The General Sabotage Group of Belgium, more commonly known as Groupe G, was a Belgian resistance group during the Second World War, founded in 1942. Groupe G's activities concentrated particularly on sabotage of German rail lines and it is widely considered to have been the most effective resistance group in Belgium during the period.

History
Groupe G was founded in 1942, by a group of former students of the Free University of Brussels and its ranks were mainly filled by students. Unusually for a resistance cell of the period, the unit's activities were not restricted to a single area as it operated across the country.

Actions
In 1944, Groupe G was responsible for a co-ordinated action on all high voltage electric lines in Belgium. This action alone is estimated to have cost German forces around 10 million man-hours of repairs before the communications were restored.

References

External links

World War II resistance movements
Military units and formations established in 1942
1942 establishments in Belgium
Belgian resistance groups